Keppel's Column is a  tower Grade II* listed building between Wentworth and Kimberworth in Rotherham, South Yorkshire, England. Keppel's Column is one of several follies in and around Wentworth Woodhouse park; the others include Hoober Stand and Needle's Eye.

History
The column was built in the late-18th century to commemorate the acquittal of the court-martialled Admiral Augustus Keppel after the Battle of Ushant. It was commissioned in 1773 by Charles Watson-Wentworth, 2nd Marquess of Rockingham and designed by John Carr. The column was finished in 1780. It was initially intended to be a landscape feature composed of pedestal surmounted by an obelisk, though at some stage the design was changed to a tall column.

In October 2021, the column was one of 142 sites across England to receive part of a £35-million grant from the government's Culture Recovery Fund.

Structure
It visibly bulges due to an entasis correction, which was rendered inappropriate when funding problems reduced the height. The column, which has an internal spiral staircase, is located on a prominent hill on the southern extent of the Wentworth Estates.

Keppel's Column had been closed to the public since the 1960s due to being unsafe, as it was in a derelict state, but was reopened to the public in September 2022.
The column can be viewed at close quarters from the public footpath running from Admiral's Crest in Scholes.

See also
Grade II* listed buildings in South Yorkshire
Listed buildings in Rotherham (Keppel Ward)

References

External links

 http://www.holisticfraternity.co.uk/Keppels.html

Buildings and structures in the Metropolitan Borough of Rotherham
Grade II* listed buildings in South Yorkshire
Towers in South Yorkshire
Folly towers in England
Towers completed in 1773